Forkhead box D3 also known as FOXD3 is a forkhead protein that in humans is encoded by the FOXD3 gene.

Function 

This gene belongs to the forkhead protein family of transcription factors which is characterized by a DNA-binding forkhead domain. FoxD3 functions as a transcriptional repressor and contains  the C-terminal engrailed homology-1 motif (eh1), which provides an interactive surface with a transcriptional co-repressor Grg4 (Groucho-related gene-4).

Stem Cells 

Multiple studies have suggested Foxd3 involvement in the transition from naive to primed pluripotent stem cells in embryo development. Previously, Foxd3 was demonstrated to be required in maintaining pluripotency in mouse embryonic stem cells. A recent finding further showed that Foxd3 is necessary as a repressor in the transition from ESC to epiblast-like cells (EpiLC). The study proposed that Foxd3 is associated with inactivation of important naive pluripotency genes by its modification of chromatin structures via recruiting histone demethylases and decreasing the number of activating factors. Another proposed mechanism on the other hand argued that Foxd3 begins nucleosome removal and induction to a "primed" pluripotent state by recruiting Brg1, a nucleosome remodeler, and then acts as a repressor of maximal activation of those enhancers by recruiting histone deacetylases, suggesting a complex mediating function in which enhancers are primed for some future controlled time-point rather than immediate expression. While there is no ambiguity that Foxd3 plays an important role regulating the transition from naive to primed pluripotency state, the two models show a different process. Attempts to reconcile the conclusions of the two studies have further suggested that Foxd3 functions as all of the above.

Neural Crest Cells 
FOXD3 plays an important role in the development and differentiation of neural crest cells. Specifically, it is thought that FOXD3 plays an important role in controlling the developmental switch between Schwann Cell Progenitors and Melanocytes.

Clinical significance 

Mutations in this gene cause vitiligo.

References

Further reading 

 
 
 
 

Forkhead transcription factors